The Putra Permai MRT station (Working name: Taman Putra Permai) is a mass rapid transit (MRT) station that will serve the suburb of Taman Putra Permai in Selangor, Malaysia. It is one of the stations being built as part of the Klang Valley Mass Rapid Transit (KVMRT) project on the Sungai Buloh-Serdang-Putrajaya Line.

Location 
The station is located on Jalan Seri Kembangan near The Atmosphere, a mixed development in Seri Kembangan. Places of interests such as Giant Seri Kembangan supermarket and Farm In The City (petting zoo) are accessible within walking distance.

Bus Services

Feeder buses

References

External links
 Taman Putra Permai MRT Station | mrt.com.my
 Klang Valley Mass Rapid Transit website
 MRT Hawk-Eye View

Petaling District
Rapid transit stations in Selangor
Sungai Buloh-Serdang-Putrajaya Line